Compsolechia ferreata is a moth of the family Gelechiidae. It was described by Edward Meyrick in 1914. It is found in Guyana.

The wingspan is 14–16 mm. The forewings are dark indigo-blue leaden with a slender rather oblique suffused blackish fascia at one-fourth, sometimes almost obsolete. The stigmata are obscure and blackish, with the plical somewhat before the first discal. There is also a narrow blackish subterminal fascia nearly parallel to the termen and a blackish streak along the termen. The hindwings are dark fuscous.

References

Moths described in 1914
Compsolechia
Taxa named by Edward Meyrick